Bright Morning Stars is the fourth full-length album from Canadian folk trio The Wailin' Jennys.

The title track is a traditional Appalachian spiritual.

Track listings

References

2011 albums
The Wailin' Jennys albums
Festival Distribution albums
Red House Records albums